This article shows the rosters of all participating teams at the 2022 FIVB Volleyball Men's Club World Championship in Betim, Brazil.

Itambé Minas
The following is the roster of the Brazilian club Itambé Minas in the 2022 FIVB Volleyball Men's Club World Championship.

Paykan Club
The following is the roster of the Iranian club Paykan Club in the 2022 FIVB Volleyball Men's Club World Championship.

Sada Cruzeiro Vôlei
The following is the roster of the Brazilian club Sada Cruzeiro Vôlei in the 2022 FIVB Volleyball Men's Club World Championship.

Sir Sicoma Monini Perugia
The following is the roster of the Italian club Sir Safety Monini Perugia in the 2022 FIVB Volleyball Men's Club World Championship.

Trentino Itas
The following is the roster of the Italian club Trentino Itas in the 2022 FIVB Volleyball Men's Club World Championship.

Vôlei Renata
The following is the roster of the Brazilian club Vôlei Renata in the 2022 FIVB Volleyball Men's Club World Championship.

References

FIVB Volleyball Club World Championship squads
FIVB